Joseph Ernest Cyr (September 4, 1854 – April 12, 1929) was a Canadian politician.

Born in Montreal, Quebec, the son of Michel Cyr and Mary-Louise Moquin, Cyr was educated at St. Laurent College near Montreal. He moved to St. Boniface, Manitoba in 1882 and was mayor in 1885. A notary, he was elected to the Legislative Assembly of Manitoba in an 1883 by-election held following the death of Alexander Kittson. Cyr was defeated when he ran for reelection to the Manitoba assembly in 1888. He was an unsuccessful candidate for the federal riding of Provencher in 1887, then was elected to the House of Commons of Canada for Provencher in 1904. In 1910, Cyr was named Superintendent of Dominion Public Works in Winnipeg.

He married Adelaide Cesarine Senez in 1875.

Electoral history

References

1854 births
1929 deaths
Liberal Party of Canada MPs
Mayors of Saint Boniface, Winnipeg
Manitoba Liberal Party MLAs
Members of the House of Commons of Canada from Manitoba
Politicians from Montreal